Leopoldo Ramón Pedro Calvo-Sotelo y Bustelo, 1st Marquess of Ría de Ribadeo (14 April 1926 – 3 May 2008), usually known as Leopoldo Calvo-Sotelo, was Prime Minister of Spain between 1981 and 1982.

Early life and career

Calvo-Sotelo was born into a prominent political family in Madrid on 14 April 1926 with his father, Leopoldo Calvo Sotelo, and his mother, Mercedes Bustelo Márquez. The assassination of his uncle, José Calvo Sotelo, who had been finance minister under Miguel Primo de Rivera, was a key event leading up to the Spanish Civil War. Calvo-Sotelo graduated as a civil engineer from the School of Civil Engineers of Madrid now part of the Technical University of Madrid, working in the area of applications of chemistry to the industry.

He was the president of Renfe (the Spanish national railroad network) between 1967 and 1968. Calvo-Sotelo was elected solicitor (Deputy) of Franco's Cortes, representing industrialists in the Union of Chemical Industries, in 1971. A monarchist, Sotelo was one of the founders of an association of politicians, mostly of Rightists and Center Rightists, which disguised as the Fedisa publishing firm helped Spain's peaceful transition into democracy.

Political career
Calvo-Sotelo was designated Minister of Commerce by Carlos Arias Navarro to be in the first government of the Monarchy (December 1975 – July 1976). He advocated a true transition to democracy instead of mere superficial changes that politicians like Navarro planned. Calvo-Sotelo was kept in the cabinet of Adolfo Suárez upon his succession to premiership in 1976 and directed several centre-right and centre-left political associations into one party, the Union of the Democratic Centre (UCD). Calvo-Sotelo was part of the Tacito group in the cabinet along with Eduardo Carriles, Andrés Reguera, Landelino Lavilla, Enrique de la Mata, Marcelino Oreja and Alfonso Osorio. The UCD won in both the June 1977 and the March 1979 elections and Calvo-Sotelo was elected MP for Madrid.

President of the Government of Spain

Suárez decided to keep him in the Cabinet, first from 1978 to 1980 as Minister for Relations of the European Economic Community, then as Second Vicepresident in charge of economic affairs. After the resignation of Suárez on 29 January 1981, he was supposed to be appointed Prime Minister on 23 February, and advocated Spain's proposed entry into NATO as soon as possible. However, on that date a session of the Congress of Deputies was interrupted by the attempted coup of 23-F. After the failed coup, his appointment as Prime Minister was confirmed on 25 February by the vote of all the UCD members of the congress and 21 others as well, giving him a majority of 186 to 158. Splits in the UCD group led to the formation of three rival parties, the Democratic Action Party (Partido de Acción Democrática/PAD), which soon merged with the Spanish Socialist Workers' Party (PSOE), the Democratic and Social Centre (CDS) and Democratic Popular Party (PDP), resulting in the UCD being unable to count on sufficient support in the legislature. Fresh elections were called, resulting in a heavy defeat for the UCD, which won only 12 seats at the 1982 election compared to 168 in 1979. He served as Prime Minister until 1 December 1982 and was succeeded by the socialist Felipe González.

Later years

In 2002, Calvo-Sotelo was raised into the Spanish nobility by King Juan Carlos of Spain and given the hereditary title of Marqués de la Ría de Ribadeo (Marquess of Ría de Ribadeo), together with the dignity Grande de España (English: Grandee of Spain), this in honour for his service.

Calvo-Sotelo was also a member of the Club of Madrid and of the Spanish Royal Academy of Engineering.

He died of natural causes at his home in Pozuelo de Alarcón, on 3 May 2008 aged 82.

Personal life
He was married to María del Pilar Ibáñez-Martín y Mellado and had eight children: 
 Leopoldo Calvo-Sotelo e Ibáñez-Martín (born 4 September 1957), 2nd Marquess of Ría de Ribadeo, married to Cristina Egea y Gutiérrez-Cortines.
 Juan Calvo-Sotelo e Ibáñez-Martín (born 14 November 1958), married to Lucía Fernández y Cartuxo
 María del Pilar Calvo-Sotelo e Ibáñez-Martín (born 20 October 1959), married to Carlos Delclaux y Zulueta
 Pedro Calvo-Sotelo e Ibáñez-Martín (born 20 December 1960), married to María Alvarez-Cascos y Gómez de Arteche
 Víctor Calvo-Sotelo e Ibáñez-Martín (born 24 November 1961), unmarried and without issue
 José María Calvo-Sotelo e Ibáñez-Martín (born 2 May 1964), unmarried and without issue
 Andrés Calvo-Sotelo e Ibáñez-Martín (born 14 August 1965), twin with the below, unmarried and without issue
 Pablo Calvo-Sotelo e Ibáñez-Martín (born 14 August 1965), twin with the above, married to Elvira García-Bellido y Capdevilla

General references

Mclean, Renwick (2006). "Spain Takes a Proud Look Back." International Herald Tribune. 24 February.
Preston, Paul (1990). The Triumph of Democracy in Spain. London: Routledge.
Rogers, Eamonn and Valerie Rogers, eds. (1999). Encyclopedia of Contemporary Spanish Culture. London: Routledge.
Walker, Jane (2006). "The Day Freedom Was Put in Peril." The Irish Times. 23 February.

References

External links

1926 births
2008 deaths
Spanish monarchists
Deputy Prime Ministers of Spain
Economy and finance ministers of Spain
Grandees of Spain
Marquesses of Spain
Members of the Cortes Españolas
Members of the constituent Congress of Deputies (Spain)
Members of the 1st Congress of Deputies (Spain)
Members of the 2nd Congress of Deputies (Spain)
MEPs for Spain 1986–1987
Politicians from Madrid
Polytechnic University of Madrid alumni
Prime Ministers of Spain
Spanish Roman Catholics
Union of the Democratic Centre (Spain) politicians